The Frank Svatos Rubblestone Barn is a historic barn located near Tabor, South Dakota, United States. It was added  to the National Register of Historic Places on July 6, 1987, as part of a "Thematic Nomination of Czech Folk Architecture of Southeastern South Dakota".

See also
National Register of Historic Places listings in Yankton County, South Dakota

References

Barns on the National Register of Historic Places in South Dakota
Buildings and structures in Yankton County, South Dakota
Czech-American culture in South Dakota
Barns in South Dakota
National Register of Historic Places in Yankton County, South Dakota